The Gentleman from Texas is a 1946 American Western film directed by Lambert Hillyer and written by J. Benton Cheney. The film stars Johnny Mack Brown, Claudia Drake, Raymond Hatton, Reno Browne, Christine McIntyre and Tris Coffin. The film was released on June 8, 1946, by Monogram Pictures.

Plot

Cast          
Johnny Mack Brown as Johnny Macklin
Claudia Drake as Kitty Malone
Raymond Hatton as Idaho Jim Foster
Reno Browne as Diane Foster 
Christine McIntyre as Flo Vickert
Tris Coffin as Steve Corbin
Marshall Reed as Duke Carter
Ted Adams as Williams
Frank LaRue as Burton Trevor
Steve Clark as Tom Jamison
Terry Frost as Ace Jenkins
Tom Carter as Burke
Jack Rockwell as Pete
Lynton Brent as Slats
Pierce Lyden as Jess Stover

References

External links
 

1946 films
American Western (genre) films
1946 Western (genre) films
Monogram Pictures films
Films directed by Lambert Hillyer
American black-and-white films
1940s English-language films
1940s American films